The 2008-09 National Division Two was the ninth and final version (twenty second overall) of the third division of the English rugby union league system using the name National Division Two.  The RFU was planning to introduced a new professionalized format of the second division for the 2009-10 season which would lead to widespread league changes throughout the English league system including National Two being renamed National One and being increased from the 14 teams to 16 teams – a decision they made halfway through the season (more information on these changes is provided in the Divisional Changes section below).  New teams to the division included Birmingham & Solihull (known the following season as Pertemps Bees) and Launceston who were relegated from the 2007–08 National Division One while promoted teams included Tynedale coming up from the 2007–08 National Division Three North  while Mounts Bay (champions) and Cinderford (playoffs) both from the 2007–08 National Division Three South.

At the end of the season Birmingham & Solihull made an instant return to the (newly named) 2009-10 RFU Championship.  They edged out runners up Cambridge by just 3 points due to the virtue of a superior bonus points record after both sides finished with 22 wins and 4 defeats each.  At the bottom of the table Waterloo, Mounts Bay, Southend and Westcombe Park were relegated with Westcombe Park and Southend dropping to the 2009–10 National League 2 South and Waterloo falling to the 2009–10 National League 2 North.  The relegation of Mounts Bay was particularly potent as it led to the club going out of business in June 2009 due to spiraling debts and an inability to cope with the increase of professionalism in the game.

Divisional Changes
Halfway through the season the RFU proposed to have a total restructuring of the league system. Resulting in many changes to the division:

The league will be increased to 16 teams
The league will be renamed National Division One
Only one team would be promoted instead of the usual two, to the new Guinness Championship
Five teams would be relegated into the division instead of the usual two
Fours teams would be promoted from National Division Three North and National Division Three South (two teams each) instead of the usual three

Participating teams and locations

Final league table

Results

Round 1

Round 2

Round 3

Round 4

Round 5

Round 6

Round 7

Round 8

Round 9

Round 10

Round 11

Round 12 

Postponed.  Game rescheduled to 14 April 2009.

Round 13 

Postponed.  Game rescheduled to 28 February 2009.

Postponed.  Game rescheduled to 7 February 2009.

Round 14 

Postponed.  Game rescheduled to 14 March 2009.

Postponed.  Game rescheduled to 17 January 2009.

Round 15 

Postponed.  Game rescheduled to 11 April 2009.

Postponed.  Game rescheduled to 2 May 2009.

Postponed.  Game rescheduled to 28 February 2009.

Postponed.  Game rescheduled to 10 April 2009.

Round 16 

Postponed.  Game rescheduled to 14 March 2009.

Postponed.  Game rescheduled to 14 March 2009.

Postponed.  Game rescheduled to 2 May 2009.

Postponed.  Game rescheduled to 2 May 2009.

Postponed.  Game rescheduled to 28 February 2009.

Round 14 (Rescheduled game) 

Game rescheduled from 20 December 2008.

Round 17

Round 18

Round 13 (Rescheduled game) 

Game rescheduled from 6 December 2008.

Round 19 

Postponed.  Game rescheduled to 11 April 2009.

Postponed.  Game rescheduled to 9 May 2009.

Postponed.  Game rescheduled to 11 April 2009.

Round 20

Rounds 13, 15 & 16 (Rescheduled games) 

Game rescheduled from 6 December 2008.

Game rescheduled from 10 January 2009.

Game rescheduled from 3 January 2009.

Round 21

Rounds 14 & 16 (Rescheduled games) 

Game rescheduled from 10 January 2009.

Game rescheduled from 10 January 2009.

Game rescheduled from 20 December 2008.

Round 22

Round 23

Round 24

Rounds 15 & 19 (Rescheduled games) 

Game rescheduled from 14 February 2009.

Game rescheduled from 3 January 2009.

Game rescheduled from 3 January 2009.

Game rescheduled from 14 February 2009.

Round 12 (Rescheduled game) 

Game rescheduled from 29 November 2008.

Round 25

Round 26

Rounds 15 & 16 (Rescheduled games) 

Game rescheduled from 3 January 2009.

Game rescheduled from 10 January 2009.

Game rescheduled from 10 January 2009.

Round 19 (Rescheduled game) 

Game rescheduled from 14 February 2009.

Total season attendances

Individual statistics 

 Note if players are tied on tries or points the player with the lowest number of appearances will come first.  Also note that points scorers includes tries as well as conversions, penalties and drop goals.

Top points scorers

Top try scorers

Season records

Team
Largest home win — 115 pts
115 - 0 Birmingham & Solihull at home to Waterloo on 4 April 2009
Largest away win — 61 pts
85 - 24 Blackheath away to Waterloo on 28 February 2009
Most points scored — 115 pts
115 - 0 Birmingham & Solihull at home to Waterloo on 4 April 2009
Most tries in a match — 17
115 - 0 Birmingham & Solihull at home to Waterloo on 4 April 2009
Most conversions in a match — 15
115 - 0 Birmingham & Solihull at home to Waterloo on 4 April 2009
Most penalties in a match — 7
Mounts Bay at home to Southend on 5 November 2008
Most drop goals in a match — 1
N/A - multiple teams

Player
Most points in a match — 35 (x2)
 Alastair Bressington for Stourbridge away to Westcombe Park on 25 October 2008
 Mark Woodrow for Birmingham & Solihull at home to Waterloo on 4 April 2009
Most tries in a match — 5
 Emyr Lewis for Redruth at home to Waterloo on 21 March 2009
Most conversions in a match — 15
 Mark Woodrow for Birmingham & Solihull at home to Waterloo on 4 April 2009
Most penalties in a match —  7
 Daniel Hawkes for Mounts Bay at home to Southend on 5 November 2008
Most drop goals in a match —  1
N/A - multiple players

Attendances
Highest — 2,218 
Redruth at home to Mounts Bay on 20 December 2008
Lowest — 131 
Westcombe Park at home to Wharfedale on 29 November 2008
Highest Average Attendance — 1,170
Redruth
Lowest Average Attendance — 233			
Westcombe Park

See also
 English Rugby Union Leagues
 English rugby union system
 Rugby union in England

References

External links
 NCA Rugby

National
National League 1 seasons